1-2-3-4 Rock and Roll is an EP produced by British heavy metal band, Girlschool. It was released in 1983 by Bronze Records, in an attempt to boost the declining sales of the band and launch the upcoming new album Play Dirty. The title track was produced by Ramones' producers Ritchie Cordell and Glen Kolotkin, who completed with samples the recording process that the band refused to carry on. The same song was released by the American band Rail the same year.

"Tush" is a re-recording of the ZZ Top song the band already covered on Hit and Run, with Kim McAuliffe on vocals instead of Enid Williams. "Don't Call It Love" is also a re-recording of the song already present in the Wildlife EP and in the album Screaming Blue Murder. Both songs were produced by Chris Tsangarides. Bronze issued also a 7-inch single with a shorter version of the title track and without the song "Emergency".

Track listing

Personnel 
 Kim McAuliffe – rhythm guitar, lead vocals
 Kelly Johnson – lead guitar, vocals
 Gil Weston – bass, vocals
 Denise Dufort – drums

References

External links 
 Official Girlschool discography

1983 EPs
Girlschool EPs
Albums produced by Chris Tsangarides
Bronze Records EPs
Albums produced by Glen Kolotkin